The 1879 East Somerset by-election was fought on 19 March 1879.  The byelection was fought due to the resignation of the incumbent Conservative MP, Ralph Shuttleworth Allen.  It was won by the unopposed Conservative candidate Lord Brooke.

References

1879 in England
1879 elections in the United Kingdom
By-elections to the Parliament of the United Kingdom in Somerset constituencies
19th century in Somerset
Unopposed by-elections to the Parliament of the United Kingdom in English constituencies